The North Beacon Street Bridge is a bridge carrying North Beacon Street (U.S. Route 20) over the Charles River between Watertown, MA and Brighton, Boston, MA.  It was built in 1917.

The southern end of the bridge is also at the western terminus Birmingham Parkway (and the extension of Soldiers Field Road, not built until 1935, itself an extension of Storrow Drive), while its northern end is at the western terminus of Greenough Boulevard, an extension of Memorial Drive.

The North Beacon Street carried by this bridge is not the same street as the well-known Beacon Street in Boston.

See also 
 
 
 
 List of crossings of the Charles River

References

External links 
 Historic Bridges of the U.S.: North Beacon Street Bridge

Bridges in Boston
Buildings and structures in Watertown, Massachusetts
Bridges completed in 1917
Bridges in Middlesex County, Massachusetts
Road bridges in Massachusetts
U.S. Route 20
Bridges of the United States Numbered Highway System
Bridges over the Charles River
Arch bridges in the United States
1917 establishments in Massachusetts